Courtney Rosholt Banghart (born May 11, 1978) is an American basketball coach who is currently the head women's basketball coach at North Carolina. Prior to North Carolina, she served as head coach at Princeton from 2007 to 2019.

Playing career
Born in Manchester, New Hampshire, Banghart graduated from Souhegan High School in Amherst, New Hampshire and Dartmouth College also in New Hampshire. As a guard, Banghart played for Dartmouth from 1996 to 2000, including the Dartmouth teams that won the 1999 and 2000 Ivy League titles. She holds Dartmouth records for 3 pointers in a game, season, and career.

Coaching career
From 2000 to 2003, Banghart was athletic director and head coach of the girls' basketball and girls' tennis teams at Episcopal High School in Alexandria, Virginia.

As an assistant coach at Dartmouth, Banghart helped lead Dartmouth to two Ivy League Championships, and two NCAA appearances in 2005 and 2006. Dartmouth went 70-44 those seasons including 41-15 in Ivy League play.

In 2007, Banghart became the head coach for the Princeton Tigers. Her teams there won five outright Ivy League championships from 2010 through 2015, and, as a result, appeared in five NCAA Women's Division I Tournaments and a sixth "at-large" appearance in 2016. Her best team was the 2014–15 unit, which went 30–0 in the regular season and defeated Green Bay in the 2015 NCAA tournament–the first NCAA Tournament win in program history. That same season saw Banghart notch her 164th win as Princeton head coach, vaulting her past Joan Kowalik to become the winningest coach in Princeton women's basketball history.

On February 3, 2017, against Dartmouth, her alma mater, Banghart notched her 200th win as a head coach. She tallied her 250th career win on March 2, 2019, against Harvard.

In April 2017, Banghart was selected to be an assistant coach for the 2017 USA Basketball Women's U23 National Team, which is composed of women, age 23 or younger, who are currently freshmen, sophomores or juniors in college. The team competed in and won the inaugural U24 Four Nations Tournament in Tokyo, Japan.

On April 30, 2019, Banghart was announced as the new head coach at North Carolina. Her first two seasons at Carolina had their share of ups and downs, however, Banghart's early Carolina tenure picked up steam on the recruiting trail, with all four signees in Carolina’s 2021 recruiting class being named to the women’s Jordan Brand Classic event.

Banghart recorded her 300th win as a head coach on February 3, 2022, against Wake Forest. Her Tar Heel team won its twentieth game on February 17 in an upset over the No. 3 ranked Louisville Cardinals, becoming the first Tar Heel women's team to post twenty overall wins and ten conference wins in a season since the 2014–15 campaign. The 2021–22 Tar Heels' 13 wins in ACC conference play are the most since the 2012–13 season, when Sylvia Hatchell's team won 14 ACC games.

Recognition
In 2015, the United States Basketball Writers Association named Banghart as Coach of the Year. Fortune named her one of the World's 50 Greatest Leaders for "taking charge of a mediocre team that had never made the NCAA Tournament" while ensuring players met Princeton's academic standards.

Head coaching record

References

External links

 "Banghart to lead UNC women's basketball program"
 

1978 births
Living people
American women's basketball coaches
Basketball coaches from New Hampshire
Basketball players from New Hampshire
Dartmouth Big Green women's basketball players
Princeton Tigers women's basketball coaches
Sportspeople from Manchester, New Hampshire
Guards (basketball)
North Carolina Tar Heels women's basketball coaches